Halls Creek Airport  is a regional airport in Western Australia's Kimberley region.

Airlines and destinations

See also
 List of airports in Western Australia
 Aviation transport in Australia

References

External links
 Airservices Aerodromes & Procedure Charts

Kimberley airports